Peracalles is a genus of hidden snout weevils in the beetle family Curculionidae. There are at least two described species in Peracalles.

Species
These two species belong to the genus Peracalles:
 Peracalles pectoralis (LeConte, 1876)
 Peracalles ventrosus (LeConte, 1878)

References

Further reading

 
 
 

Cryptorhynchinae
Articles created by Qbugbot